Veronika Malá (born 6 May 1994) is a Czech handballer for Paris 92 and the Czech national team.

She participated at the 2018 European Women's Handball Championship.

Achievements
EHF European League:
Winner: 2022
Bundesliga:
Winner: 2022

References

External links

1994 births
Living people
Sportspeople from Písek
Czech female handball players
Expatriate handball players
Czech expatriate sportspeople in France
Czech expatriate sportspeople in Germany